Ernest Young (1880–1953) was a British Member of Parliament with the Liberal Party.

Ernest or Ernie Young may also refer to:
Ernest Young (priest), an Archdeacon of Calcutta in the mid-20th century
Ernest P. Young (born c. 1940), American historian at the University of Michigan
Ernie Young (born 1969), American baseball outfielder and coach
Ernie Young (footballer, born 1892) (1892–1962), English football forward for South Shields and Durham City
Ernie Young (footballer, born 1893) (1893–1950), English football forward for Middlesbrough and Darlington

See also 
Ernst & Young, a multi-national professional services company based in London
Wilfred Ernest Young (1891 – after 1920), English World War I flying ace